Sara Martins (born 19 August 1977) is a Portuguese-born French actress of Cape Verdean descent. She is known in France for her roles on television and in film and theatre. She also appeared as Detective Sergeant Camille Bordey in the joint British-French crime comedy-drama Death in Paradise, filmed in Guadeloupe, a French overseas department. She left the show halfway through series 4 (January 2015).
She later returned to Season 10 E6 to reprise her role temporarily.

Early life
Martins was born in Faro, in the Portuguese region of Algarve, and is of Cape Verdean descent.
She moved to France at the age of three.
She studied ballet in her youth and was the first person of African descent to join the Lyon Opera. She learned that she would be unable to advance to the Paris Opera, where the corps was expected to look alike and there were no other black dancers. Instead, she received her Baccalauréat with a theater option.
After receiving a DEUG in law, at age 20 she studied at the École de théâtre Les Enfants Terribles in Paris.
Then, she completed an acting degree at the extremely selective French National Academy of Dramatic Arts.
She learned English through U2 lyrics as a teenager.

Career

Early work
Shortly after graduating from high school, Martins was hired by Roger Planchon for a local production of Le Radeau de la Méduse at the Théâtre National Populaire in Villeurbanne.
She appeared in a play at the Young Vic in London called Le Costume (The Suit) and in a French-language production of David Mamet’s Race.

Martins' television debut was in 2001, in the French police series Police District. She appeared in the series Pigalle, la nuit as Fleur. While filming Death in Paradise, Martins worked on the French TV crime series Détectives in lead role of Nora Abadie.

She appeared in the film Paris, je t'aime (2006) in the segment Parc Monceau, the 17th arrondissement.

Death in Paradise
In April 2011, BBC One announced that Martins would appear in the crime comedy-drama Death in Paradise, co-produced with France Télévisions. The series was Martins' debut in both comedy and on British television. Martins did have experience playing a police officer. Death in Paradise premiered on 25 October 2011. Martins played Camille Bordey, a detective sergeant on the fictional Caribbean island of Saint-Marie. Camille and other local officers help British Detective Inspector Richard Poole (played by Ben Miller in the first two series) solve murders. During a stunt for a first series episode, Martins tore her achilles tendon. She has said that during the production of Death in Paradise she discovered that some of her mannerisms are distinctly French.

The third series killed off Inspector Poole in the first episode and he was replaced by another British Detective Inspector, Humphrey Goodman (played by Kris Marshall). The fourth episode of the fourth series "Until Death Do You Part", was Martins' last; her character was written out as moving to Paris. Of her departure from the show, she is quoted as saying: "I’ve loved everything about the show. But the only way to grow in life is to take risks, even if it means losing something you love, or leaving a place that’s comfortable". In 2021, she and Miller returned for a two-part episode.

Later appearances
Sara Martins appeared in two French detective shows, La Loi de … Alexandre, first episode (Comme des frères), and Capitaine Marleau, episode 2 (La mémoire enfouie) in Series 2. She appeared in the British series  Father Brown in 2018 as the wife of criminal Flambeau.

In 2018, she had the role of police inspector in the television movie Un Mensonge Oublié, English title Children of the Lie. She also appeared in Kiss & Tell (Voyez Comme On Danse) and the British tv movie, I Love My Mum.

In 2020, she played the police detective in the French television series of 8 episodes, Grand Hôtel. She appeared as Victoire in Reunions, a French television series set on La Réunion, for 6 episodes. She played Diane Dombre in the French television series Alexandra Ehle, about a persistent coroner in Bordeaux.

She is slated to appear in Citadel, expected to air on Prime Video in 2023.

Selected filmography

Film

Television

References

External links

Sara Martins filmography
Allocine.fr

1977 births
21st-century French actresses
French film actresses
French National Academy of Dramatic Arts alumni
French people of Cape Verdean descent
French stage actresses
French television actresses
Living people
People from Faro, Portugal
Portuguese emigrants to France